The Bush–Breyman Block, located in Salem, Oregon, is listed on the National Register of Historic Places.

References

1889 establishments in Oregon
Buildings and structures completed in 1889
National Register of Historic Places in Salem, Oregon
Queen Anne architecture in Oregon
Individually listed contributing properties to historic districts on the National Register in Oregon